The 1958–59 St. Louis Hawks season was the franchise's 13th season in the NBA. Despite winning the NBA Championship, Alex Hannum was replaced as coach of the Hawks in 1958–59. The new coach was Andy Phillip, and he lasted 10 games before being replaced by Ed Macauley.
The Hawks made player changes. Clyde Lovellette was brought in from the Cincinnati Royals.
The Hawks won the Western Division with a record of 49 wins and 23 losses. Bob Pettit won his 2nd NBA MVP award as he led the league in scoring with 29.2 points per game.
In the Western Division Finals, the Hawks were defeated by the Minneapolis Lakers in 6 games.

Roster

<noinclude>

Regular season

Season standings

Record vs. opponents

Game log

Playoffs

|- align="center" bgcolor="#ccffcc"
| 1
| March 21
| Minneapolis
| W 124–90
| Cliff Hagan (40)
| —
| Kiel Auditorium
| 1–0
|- align="center" bgcolor="#ffcccc"
| 2
| March 22
| @ Minneapolis
| L 98–106
| Cliff Hagan (27)
| Bob Pettit (7)
| Minneapolis Auditorium
| 1–1
|- align="center" bgcolor="#ccffcc"
| 3
| March 24
| Minneapolis
| W 127–97
| Bob Pettit (39)
| Cliff Hagan (18)
| Kiel Auditorium9,324
| 2–1
|- align="center" bgcolor="#ffcccc"
| 4
| March 26
| @ Minneapolis
| L 98–108
| Cliff Hagan (38)
| —
| Minneapolis Auditorium
| 2–2
|- align="center" bgcolor="#ffcccc"
| 5
| March 28
| Minneapolis
| L 97–98 (OT)
| Bob Pettit (36)
| —
| Kiel Auditorium
| 2–3
|- align="center" bgcolor="#ffcccc"
| 6
| March 29
| @ Minneapolis
| L 104–106
| Bob Pettit (24)
| Clyde Lovellette (15)
| Minneapolis Auditorium10,179
| 2–4
|-

Awards and honors
Bob Pettit, NBA Most Valuable Player Award
Bob Pettit, All-NBA First Team
Slater Martin, All-NBA Second Team
Cliff Hagan, All-NBA Second Team

References

Hawks on Basketball Reference

St. Louis
Atlanta Hawks seasons
St. Louis Hawks
St. Louis Hawks